For the language learning software with the same name see Before You Know It

Byki  is a village in the administrative district of Gmina Biała Rawska, within Rawa County, Łódź Voivodeship, in central Poland.

References

Byki